Otagiri Dam (also sometimes read as Odagiri Dam) is a dam in the Nagano Prefecture, Japan, completed in 1954.

Name origin 
The name of the dam originates from the old village “Otagiri” (小田切) (not "Odagiri"). Etymologically “Otagiri” consists of “O” and “tagiri”. “O” is a prefix of Japanese. “Tagiri” is the gerund of the verb “tagiru” (it means the motion of water like “boil”). In Nagano Prefecture there are many such place names like "Tagiri", “Ô-tagiri”, "Naka-tagiri", “Inu-tagiri”, “Fut-tagiri”, and “Ka-tagiri”.

References 

Dams in Nagano Prefecture
Dams completed in 1954